Donata Leśnik is a Polish international football defender currently playing for Unia Racibórz. She previously played for Medyk Konin.

She scored in Poland's first game in the 2011 World Cup qualifying against Ukraine.

References

External links

1991 births
Living people
Women's association football defenders
Polish women's footballers
Place of birth missing (living people)
Poland women's international footballers
Medyk Konin players
RTP Unia Racibórz players